Schizomus peteloti is a species of short-tailed whipscorpions of the genus Schizomus that belong to the family Hubbardiidae of arachnids.

References 

Schizomida
Animals described in 1946